The Dragon Bridge (historically also ) is a road bridge located in Ljubljana, the capital of Slovenia. It crosses the Ljubljanica River. between Kopitar Street and Ressel Street, to the north of the Ljubljana Central Market at Vodnik Square. It was built in the beginning of the 20th century, when Ljubljana was part of the Austro-Hungarian Empire. As one of the best examples of reinforced concrete bridges and of the Vienna Secession style, the bridge is today protected as a technical monument. It is intended primarily for motorised traffic.

Name
The bridge was originally named The Jubilee Bridge of the Emperor Franz Josef I. In July 1919, it was renamed to Dragon Bridge.

History

The bridge was built as part of a wider urban renovation of the town during the administration of the mayor Ivan Hribar. It replaced an old oak bridge named the Butchers' Bridge, which was constructed in 1819 and damaged by a severe earthquake in 1895. The new bridge was constructed of reinforced concrete. Janez Koželj, a professor of urban design, expressed in 2010 his opinion that the new technology of reinforced concrete and new static calculations were used in Ljubljana instead of Vienna, because it meant minor consequences if they had not worked.

The new bridge was constructed upon the plans of Vienna company Pittel+Brausewetter based on a patent by Austrian engineer Josef Melan and the design by the company's architect , the graduate of Otto Wagner's school. The works started on 1 July 1900 and were at first led by Austrian engineer Alexander Zabokrzycky, assisted by Filip Supančič from Ljubljana. After a dispute, the works were in April 1901 taken over by the architect Ciril Metod Koch, also from Ljubljana. The final works were completed until 1907. The dragons were designed by Zaninović and produced in the Vienna factory A. M. Beschorner. When the bridge was completed, it was dedicated to Franz Joseph I of the Habsburg Dynasty to commemorate forty years of his rule from 1848 to 1888.

In 1983 and 1984, the Dragon Bridge was renovated with lightweight concrete, and its centenary was celebrated in 2001.

Architecture
The Dragon Bridge, although significantly modelled after the Nußdorf weir, is often regarded as the most beautiful bridge produced by the Vienna Secession. It was one of Europe's earliest reinforced concrete bridges and the first such bridge in  Ljubljana. It was the first bridge in Slovenia to be paved with asphalt. When opened in 1901, it had the third-largest arch in Europe at that time. The bridge is built to the "Melan System'"' invented by Josef Melan, which gained popularity particularly in the United States and Germany because the bridges could be built without a supporting stage. Rigid truss arches made of iron are set into the reinforced concrete bridge. The load-bearing core of the bridge was the truss iron framework during construction. After concreting, this became a part of the supporting structure.

Its style was designed by Jurij Zaninović. He envisaged the concrete covering, the balustrades and the sheet-copper dragon statues of the bridge, which is now a symbol of the city. The chief attraction of the bridge are these four dragon statues standing on pedestals at its four corners. In addition, the bridge is decorated by sixteen smaller dragon statues.

Legend
There is a legend that Jason was the founder of Ljubljana, and he and his Argonauts killed a dragon. This is one of the four dragon statues in the bridge. According to local legends, when a virgin crosses the bridge, the dragons will wag their tails. Some local people have nicknamed this structure "mother-in-law" because of its fiery nature.

References

External links

Bridges in Ljubljana
Bridges completed in 1901
Arch bridges in Slovenia
Road bridges in Slovenia
Art Nouveau architecture in Ljubljana
Concrete bridges
Bridges over the Ljubljanica
Center District, Ljubljana
Art Nouveau bridges
Sculptures of dragons
20th-century architecture in Slovenia